The 2002 Sun Belt Conference men's basketball tournament was held March 1–5 at the Lakefront Arena at the University of New Orleans in New Orleans, Louisiana.

The top-seed in the East division Western Kentucky defeated West division top-seed  in the championship game, 76–70, to win their fourth Sun Belt men's basketball tournament.

The Hilltoppers, in turn, received an automatic bid to the 2002 NCAA tournament as the #9 seed in the Midwest region. No other Sun Belt members earned bids to the tournament.

Format
All eleven participating Sun Belt members were seeded based on regular season conference records, with the five highest-seeded teams were awarded byes into the quarterfinal round while the six lowest-seeded teams entered the bracket in the preliminary first round.

Bracket

See also
Sun Belt Conference women's basketball tournament

References

Sun Belt Conference men's basketball tournament
Tournament
Sun Belt Conference men's basketball tournament
Sun Belt Conference men's basketball tournament